The Bahay na Pula (Tagalog, 'Red House') is a former hacienda in San Ildefonso, Bulacan in the Philippines. The site is remembered for the mass rapes and murders committed by the Imperial Japanese Army during World War II. The Japanese military murdered all of the men and boys in the adjacent Mapaniqui, Candaba, Pampanga, and forced over 100 women and girls into sexual slavery, confining and raping them in the Red House.

History 
The Red House was constructed in 1929 at Barangay Anyantam under the orders of Don Ramon Ilusorio of the Ilusorio family, who owned vast hacienda lands in the area. It was made largely out of wood and painted red on the outside, giving it its name. The house was surrounded by large gardens filled with tamarind, camachile, and duhat trees.

During the Japanese occupation of the Philippines, on November 23, 1944, the Geki Group of the 14th District Army under Japanese Imperial Army General Tomoyuki Yamashita attacked Mapaniqui, Pampanga. Under the assumption that Mapaniqui was a guerilla hideout, Japanese soldiers plundered and incinerated the town, corralled and executed all the men and boys, killing some women and children in the carnage, and forcibly confined and repeatedly raped women and girls in the Red House. According to the testimony of Maria Lalu Quilantang, a survivor, she witnessed her father being castrated and his "penis stuffed in his mouth like a cigar.". Narcisa Claveria, a survivor, said she witnessed a Japanese soldier skin her father "like a water buffalo" with a bayonet. The corpses of the slaughtered people were all thrown into a huge pile and set on fire in a schoolyard.

The Japanese Imperial Army looted numerous households in the area. Women, who numbered more than a hundred and came from the local provinces of Bulacan and Pampanga, were ordered to carry provisions and loot to the Red House, which Japanese troops were using as a garrison. Once they arrived, they were sexually enslaved at the Red House. Several of the girls were eight and nine years of age. One woman Lola Honor, a prepubescent girl at the time was stabbed by a bayonet in her thigh when she refused the advances of a soldier.  Documented reports have showed various human rights violations.

Most of the survivors have changed residences due to the memories of the Japanese occupation in the area and the atrocities committed by the Japanese Imperial Army. In 1997, "The Malaya Lolas" (The Free Grandmothers), an organization of women fighting for their rights and compensation for the losses from the war, was established in Pampanga. The Asian Women's Fund, created by the Japanese government and funded by Japanese citizen donations to distribute monetary compensation to comfort women, did not provide compensation to the women who were sexual enslaved at the Red House. According to Asian Women's Fund, the victims were not defined as comfort women, as they were not held or abused over an extended period. The Filipino survivors demand that the Japanese government take legal responsibility by making a public apology that will explicitly acknowledge the sexual violence committed against the women, and providing compensation to the victims.

In 2014, the Supreme Court of the Philippines denied the motion for reconsideration filed by Malaya Lola, who wanted to declare the Philippine government guilty of grave abuse of discretion for refusing to support their claims against the Japanese army for war crimes and crimes against humanity.

In 2016, due to a feuding internal conflict between members of the Ilosorio family, the heritage structure was partially demolished. The house was allegedly going to be rebuilt in Las Casas Filipinas de Acuzar in Bataan province. The framed and roof of the house has remained and still features its iconic base and color. In November 2016, several human rights group, including Bertha's Impact Opportunity Fund, the European Center for Constitutional and Human Rights, and the Center for International Law, Manila, traveled to Geneva to seek the United Nations' support on behalf of the group. In 2017, Cinema One Originals launched a full-length documentary film about Bahay-na-Pula, the comfort women who suffered, and the battle they are facing even up til now, where most of the women are now in their 80s and 90s.

Some historians and cultural heritage workers have expressed the need for the site's conservation. The house was partially dismantled after 2014 and was in danger of collapse. The survivors would like the house to act as a memorial to those who fell victim to the Imperial Japanese Army at the Red House.

In Media 
Bahay na Pula 2022 Film

See also
Malaya Lolas
Wartime sexual violence
Japanese war crimes
Comfort women

References

External links 

Virtual tour: Bahay na Pula

Buildings and structures in Bulacan
Houses in the Philippines
Military history of the Philippines during World War II
Comfort women
Japanese war crimes
Wartime sexual violence